Eclipse Island is a barren island in Western Australia,  due south of Albany, and  south of the nearest point of the mainland coast, which is Cave Point on the southern coast of Torndirrup Peninsula. Eclipse Island Lighthouse is located near the centre of the island. Nearby South West Island contains Western Australia's southernmost landmass.

Naming
The island was named for an observation on 28 September 1791 by Captain George Vancouver "observed this Wednesday morning a partial solar eclipse. He went on the name the barren rocky cluster of isles."

The island supports a large colony of introduced rabbits and another common introduced pest the arum lily has also been introduced to the island in the past.

It is a waypoint for the Volvo Ocean Race.

In 1950 four families were living on the island.

Birds
The island has been classified as an Important Bird Area because it has been reported as supporting over 1% of the world's breeding population of flesh-footed shearwaters (6000-8000 pairs) and great-winged petrels (10,000-15,000 pairs). Other birds that are found on the island include wedge-tailed shearwaters, little shearwaters, Caspian terns and Pacific gulls.

Climate 
Greatly exposed to the westerly storm track, Eclipse Island has extraordinarily cool summers for its latitude at a little over 35 degrees south; perhaps among the coolest in the world. Summers closely resemble those in England, more than 15 degrees farther from the equator. It rains on 181 days of the year, which is equal to many climates in Scotland—more than 20 degrees poleward. 

References

External links
 

Islands of the Great Southern (Western Australia)
Important Bird Areas of Western Australia
Albany, Western Australia